Spring Creek is an unincorporated community in San Saba County, in the U.S. state of Texas. According to the Handbook of Texas, the community had a population of 20 in 2000.

History
A post office named Bomar was established here in 1905 and remained in operation until 1914. It was operated in Mrs. W.H. Ledbetter's home and named it after her parents, James and Lucinda. Spring Creek had a community center, a church, a cemetery, and one business in 1984. Its population was 20 in 2000.

Geography

Education
The first school in Spring Creek opened in either the late 1870s or early 1880s. It was also served by the Cat Claw School in 1949 and joined the San Saba Independent School District.

References

Unincorporated communities in San Saba County, Texas
Unincorporated communities in Texas